Glitch is an Australian supernatural drama television series developed by Tony Ayres and Louise Fox, which is set in the fictional country town of Yoorana, Victoria, and follows seven people who return from the dead in perfect health but with no memory. No one in the town knows why the deceased have returned.

Glitch premiered on 9 July 2015 on ABC and the first series was awarded Best Television Drama Series at the 2016 AACTA Awards. The series also won Most Outstanding Drama Series at the 2016 Logie Awards.

Although the show bears remarkable similarity to the 2012 French series Les Revenants, which was broadcast internationally as The Returned and adapted as an American series with that title, the writers insist Glitch was not influenced by it and "the first script was written before I even saw the French film of The Returned."

On 26 October 2015, ABC TV renewed the show for a second series of six episodes. The second series premiered on 14 September 2017 on ABC. Series two follows James and the Risen as they begin to unravel the mystery of how and why they are back, though their journey of reconciliation, romance, and revenge is soon disrupted by a new and even more lethal threat. 

The first series was made available to stream on Netflix globally on 15 October 2016. Series 2 premiered on 28 November 2017 internationally on Netflix. The show concluded with the third season, which premiered on 25 August 2019. Netflix globally released series 3 on 25 September 2019.

Plot
James Hayes (Patrick Brammall) is a small town policeman in Yoorana, Victoria. He is called to the local cemetery in the middle of the night, only to discover some people that have risen from the dead in perfect health but with no memory of their identities or past. They are determined to find out who they are and what has happened to them. James struggles to keep the mysterious case hidden from his colleagues, family, and the world, with the help of local doctor Elishia McKellar (Genevieve O'Reilly). The people are all linked in some way, and the search begins for someone who knows the truth about how and why they have returned.

Cast

Main
 Patrick Brammall as Sgt. James Hayes
 Genevieve O'Reilly as Dr. Elishia McKellar (series 1–2)
 Emma Booth as Kate Willis
 Emily Barclay as Sarah Hayes (series 1–2)
 Ned Dennehy as Patrick "Paddy" Fitzgerald (series 1–2)
 Sean Keenan as Charlie Thompson
 Hannah Monson as Kirsten "Kirstie" Darrow
 Aaron McGrath as Beau Cooper
 Rodger Corser as John Doe/William Blackburn
 Andrew McFarlane as Vic Eastley (series 1–2)
 Daniela Farinacci as Maria Rose Massola (series 1)
 John Leary as Chris Rennox
 Luke Arnold as Owen Nillson (series 2–3)
 Rob Collins as Phil Holden (series 2–3)
 Pernilla August as Nicola Heysen (series 2–3)
 Jessica Faulkner as Belle Donohue (series 3)
 Harry Tseng as Tam "Chi" Chi Wai (series 3)
 Dustin Clare as Mark Clayton-Stone (series 3)

Recurring
 Anni Finsterer as Caroline Eastley
 Lisa Flanagan as Kath
 Robert Menzies as Pete Rennox
 Tessa Rose as Sharon
 Gerard Kennedy as Leon Massola
 Antonio Kapusi-Starow as Young Leon
 Phoebe Gorozidis as Anna
 Alison Whyte as Lucy Fitzgerald
 Nicholas Denton as Angus Fitzgerald
 Jacob Collins-Levy as Rory Fitzgerald
 Greg Stone as Russell
 Leila Gurruwiwi as Kalinda
 James Monarski as Carlo Nico
 Katrina Milosevic as Ellen
 Lex Marinos as Steve Tripidakis
 Max Brown as David Goldman
Dalip Sondhi as Samarvart Chadra Gard
 Rhys Mitchell as Young Paddy
 Jackson Gallagher as Raf
 Susan Prior as Anne Donohue
 Taylor Ferguson as Judith Donohue
 Reef Ireland as Luke Donohue
 Simon Maiden as Duncan
 Alex Rowe as Young Pete Rennox

Episodes

Season 1 (2015)

Season 2 (2017)

Season 3 (2019)

Home media

Reception 
On the review aggregator website Rotten Tomatoes, season 1 of Glitch has an approval rating of 80% based on 5 reviews. Likewise, season 2 has an approval rating of 80% based on 5 reviews.

Awards and nominations 

Glitch was screened at Roma Fiction Fest in 2015.

See also 
 Les Revenants
 The Returned
 Resurrection

References

External links
 
 

2010s Australian drama television series
2015 Australian television series debuts
2019 Australian television series endings
Australian Broadcasting Corporation original programming
Australian science fiction television series
English-language Netflix original programming
Paranormal television
Television series by Matchbox Pictures
Television series created by Tony Ayres